Þorlákur Runólfsson (1086–1133;;) was an Icelandic clergyman, who became the third bishop of Iceland from 1118 to his death in 1133, following the adoption of Christianity in 1000. He served in the diocese of Skálholt.

See also
List of Skálholt bishops

Thorlakur Runolfsson
1086 births
1133 deaths
12th-century Icelandic people